Kodachrome is a 2017 American comedy-drama film directed by Mark Raso and written by Jonathan Tropper, based on a 2010 New York Times article by A.G. Sulzberger. It stars Ed Harris, Jason Sudeikis, Elizabeth Olsen, Bruce Greenwood, Wendy Crewson, and Dennis Haysbert. The film had its world premiere at the 2017 Toronto International Film Festival on September 8, 2017, and was released on April 20, 2018, by Netflix.

Plot
In late 2010, Matt Ryder is a A&R representative at a Manhattan record label who is in danger of losing his job after his company's biggest client signs with another label. His father Ben's assistant and nurse Zooey informs him that Ben, a famous photographer, is terminally ill with liver cancer. Though they have not spoken in over ten years, Ben has requested that Matt drive him to Dwayne's Photo in Parsons, Kansas, the last shop that develops Kodachrome film. Ben has several rolls he wants to have processed before he dies, and Dwayne's will stop in the near future because Kodak no longer makes the required dyes.

Ben's manager Larry persuades Matt to go by arranging a meeting between Matt and the Spare Sevens, a band he has been trying to sign. Matt, Ben and Zooey start the journey, and Ben insists on taking back roads so he can take photos and enjoy the scenery. In Ohio, the group visits Ben's brother Dean and Dean's wife Sarah, who were Matt's surrogate parents following his mother's death. Zooey and Matt bond over Matt's old music collection, and later a drunk Matt leans in to kiss her, but falls off the bed. He sleeps on the floor, and they share stories of their failed marriages. The next morning, Zooey is awakened by Ben, who has fallen in the bathroom and needs help to stand. Ben irritates Dean and Sarah at breakfast by mentioning that he and Sarah once had a sexual relationship. Sarah explains that it was before she and Dean dated, which does little to assuage Dean's anger.

In Chicago, Matt makes his pitch to the Spare Sevens, and follows his father's advice not to tell the band how great they are, but to point out what they are doing wrong and why they need Matt to fix it. Lead singer Jasper and the other members admire Matt's nerve and begin to agree to the outlines of a deal, but start to mock Ben when he accidentally urinates on himself. Though it will probably cost him his job, Matt tells them he does not respect them and leaves the meeting to check on his father.

At their hotel, Ben expresses disappointment that Matt did not close the deal. Zooey points out that Matt made a career-ending decision to defend his father, which leads to Ben firing her. Zooey joins Matt at a bar, where he receives several texts from his boss confirming that he has been fired. They continue to drink, then spend the night together. The next morning, Zooey calls her night with Matt a mistake and returns to New York. Matt receives no answer at Ben's door and has hotel staff open it. Ben is unconscious on the floor, and Matt has him rushed to the hospital. The doctor tells Matt that Ben's cancer can no longer be treated, he cannot travel, and he should be placed in hospice care. That night, Ben struggles to load film into a camera, eliciting Matt's help. Through tears, Ben tells Matt that he does not expect forgiveness for his shortcomings as a father, but that he loves him. Matt and Ben embrace.

The next day, Matt and Ben leave the hospital to finish the trip to Parsons, which will require driving nonstop overnight to make it to the photo lab in time. They drop off Ben's film at Dwayne's, where Ben is recognized by several patrons, most of whom are well-known photographers. Several ask to have photos taken with Ben, giving Matt insight into his father's influence and legacy. In their hotel room, Ben is cleaning his camera when he dies. Larry arrives to make funeral arrangements and Dwayne delivers the developed photos. Matt offers them to Larry, but Larry refuses, saying Ben's wish was for Matt to curate them for a showing. At Ben's home, Matt loads the photo slides into a projector and is surprised to see dozens of pictures of himself as a boy, many with his deceased mother, and some with his father. Zooey arrives and asks if he would like company, then they stand together as they view Ben's slides.

Cast

Production
The film is based on the December 29, 2010 New York Times article "For Kodachrome Fans, Road Ends at Photo Lab in Kansas", by A.G. Sulzberger. Filming began in Toronto on August 28, 2016. Filming also took place in Shelburne, Ontario, which was used to portray Parsons, Kansas. Cinematographer Alan Poon shot the film on Kodak 35 mm film.

Release

Kodachrome premiered at the 2017 Toronto International Film Festival on September 8, 2017. Shortly after, Netflix acquired the film's distribution rights for $4 million. The film was released on April 20, 2018.

Critical reception
On review aggregator website Rotten Tomatoes, the film holds an approval rating of 71% based on 49 reviews, with a weighted average of 6.24/10. The website's critical consensus reads, "Kodachrome gains richer hues due to Ed Harris' colorful performance, which is enough to enliven a solid if predictable father-son road trip drama." On Metacritic, the film has a weighted average score of 57 out of 100, based on 17 critics, indicating "mixed or average reviews".

References

External links
 
 
 

2017 films
2017 comedy-drama films
2017 independent films
2010s American films
2010s English-language films
2010s road comedy-drama films
21 Laps Entertainment films
American independent films
American road comedy-drama films
English-language Netflix original films
Films about cancer
Films about father–son relationships
Films about photographers
Films based on newspaper and magazine articles
Films directed by Mark Raso
Films set in 2010
Films set in Chicago
Films set in Kansas
Films set in Manhattan
Films set in Ohio
Films shot in Toronto
Works about the music industry